The Prisoner of St. Petersburg is a 1989 Australian drama film directed by Ian Pringle. It was screened in the Un Certain Regard section at the 1989 Cannes Film Festival.

The film was the first Australian-West German co-production. It was shot over 22 days in Germany. David Stratton wrote that the film "appeared to be commercially doomed from the beginning".

Cast
 Efrem Accurso as Italian truck driver
 Ifrim Bender as Russian man with coat
 Solveig Dommartin as Elena
 Johanna Karl-Lory as Old woman
 Lars Michalak as Russian man behind door
 Michael Obinja as Russian man on train
 Pat O'Connell as Singing Irish man
 Olivier Picot as Stefan
 René Schönenberger as Businessman
 Wieland Speck as Youth in bar
 Denis Staunton as Irish man
 Hans Martin Stier as Truck driver
 Noah Taylor as Jack
 Katja Teichmann as Johanna
 Ralph Wittgrebe as German drunk
 Christian Zertz as Lorenzo

References

External links

The Prisoner of St Petersburg at Oz Movies

1989 films
1989 drama films
Films directed by Ian Pringle
Australian drama films
1980s English-language films
1980s Australian films